Bluestone Group is a financial services and technology business with offices in the UK and Ireland.

History
Bluestone Group was established in 2000 in Australia as a specialist residential mortgage lender. The business was founded by Alistair Jeffery, an investment banker who had worked at Goldman Sachs and Nomura Securities in London during the 1990s. The first loan was settled in December 2000, and in the following year, a modest A$50m residential loans were written.

Bluestone's first office was in Sydney's Chifley Tower. In 2001 the business moved to Clarence Street before relocating to its Sydney office to Kent Street and then to 101 Sussex Street. The business funded its early expansion with a series of private equity rounds. The first round of A$1.8m was completed in June 2000. The subscribers were primarily private investors. A further A$4m was raised in September 2001 from RMB Ventures, the Australian venture capital arm of First National Bank (South Africa). Crescent Capital and the Liberman Family invested further expansion funds in 2002, and ABN AMRO invested A$5m in 2005.

Bluestone's start-up funding was provided via a A$250m warehouse line provided by Nomura International, part of the Nomura Group. Nomura exited its funding line in 2003 by syndicating its warehouse line to Barclays.

Expansion
Between 2002 and 2006, Bluestone grew strongly. The business wrote around $100m new loans in 2002, and closed its first securitisation, Sapphire I, in May 2002. Loan volumes doubled year on year for the following few years, with the business winning the BRW Fast 100 for the fastest growing private company in 2004. Bluestone's revenue growth for the prior 3 years was an extraordinary 800%, a Fast 100 record. The following year, Bluestone was again featured in the top 10 of the Fast 100, with turnover of A$56m and an annual average growth rate of 178%.

In 2002, Bluestone established residential lending operations in New Zealand, and in 2004, the business started work on a reverse mortgage unit, specialising in lending to retirees, many of whom are 'asset-rich, cash-poor'. Bluestone was the first major non-bank reverse mortgage lender in Australia, and the first lender in Australia to offer a 'fixed for life' product so that borrowers were not exposed to long dated interest rate risk. Bluestone's lump sum reverse mortgage product was expanded to include a 'draw-down' style product in 2006, allowing borrowers to receive funds in regular payments. A 'capped for life' product soon followed, and in 2007, the reverse mortgage product was launched in New Zealand.

In late 2005, Bluestone concluded a major liquidity event, providing an opportunity for existing shareholders to sell down their stake or exit completely, and new investors to join. RMB Ventures, who had invested initially in 2001, exited completely, and some other shareholders sold down their stakes. The resulting block of around 50% shares in the business was acquired by ABN AMRO (and funds managed by ABN AMRO Capital), and UK fund manager Cambridge Place. The transaction valued Bluestone at A$150m.

In 2024, Bluestone broadened its product suite further to include a small-ticket commercial product, lending to primarily self-employed borrowers secured on retail units, office blocks, small commercial buildings and the like. In 2006, the group also developed a servicing business, Bluestone Servicing. Up until this point, the day-to-day administration of Bluestone's now A$3b loan portfolio had been outsourced to AMS, a subsidiary of General Electric. In early 2007, this business was bought in-house, materially increasing Bluestone's gross revenues and diversifying the business away from the 'originate - securitise' model. Bluestone Servicing was awarded an Above Average servicer rating by Standard & Poors in 2008, and a Special Servicer rating of 2 (Primary Servicing 2-) by Fitch Ratings in 2009.

Funding
Bluestone originated loans using shorter term warehouse funding, provided by Nomura International, Westpac and Barclays. The warehouse lines were periodically refinanced via securitisation, a process in which portfolios of loans are sold to special purpose entities which issue mortgage backed bonds to fund the purchase. Bluestone completed seventeen securitisations totalling over A$4.5b between April 2002 and February 2008. The Sapphire series comprised eleven Australian and four New Zealand transactions involving residential mortgages. Emerald I and II were the first securitisations of Australian reverse mortgages. Bluestone was the first issuer in Australia to have transactions rated by all three major rating agencies (Standard & Poors, Fitch Ratings and Moody's), and bonds were sold to a mix of Australasian, Asian and European investors. In 2003, Bluestone became the first lender to issue notes secured by mortgage backed bonds to retail investors in New Zealand. The Sapphire Securities series was fully repaid in 2007.

The Global Financial Crisis (GFC)
In early 2007, Bluestone employed over 200 staff and was originating around A$100m per month of residential, commercial and reverse mortgage business. The market for mortgage backed securities (RMBS) changed radically in July 2007, the start of the Credit Crunch. From this point onwards, risk aversion in the debt capital markets increased sharply, and the RMBS market effectively shut in early 2008. RAMS, a large non-bank mortgage lender failed in August 2007, the first major casualty of the credit crunch in Australia. The business had been listed on the Australian Securities Exchange just eight weeks earlier at a market capitalisation of A$880m.

Bluestone was one of the last lenders to access the Australian and NZ debt capital markets without government support in late 2007 and early 2008, placing approx. A$650m of mortgage backed bonds. The environment deteriorated again sharply in 2008 as the equity markets caught up with the scale of the turmoil in the structured credit markets, and started a major sell-off. Confidence in financial institutions of all types deteriorated throughout the year, and many banks struggled to fund themselves in the interbank markets, where borrowing rates rose sharply. Pressure built for financial institutions on multiple fronts, culminating in the failure of Lehman Brothers in September 2008. Governments in most developed countries implemented emergency support strategies designed to back-stop their struggling banks. In Australia, bank deposits were guaranteed and a small (A$7b) mortgage backed bond purchase programme was introduced by the government. Government strategies were virtually all based on supporting their various regulated banking systems however, and non-bank lenders such as Bluestone were largely left to fend for themselves. Most non-bank lenders radically curtailed their lending as a result, or stopped completely. Bluestone ceased new lending in May 2008, with the exception of further advances and re-draws to existing customers, and regular payments to its existing reverse mortgage customers.

Capital and Asset Management: 2009 - 14
In 2008, Bluestone re-oriented its business away from an originate / securitise, towards a 'servicing-centric' business model. The business was able to leverage its experience originating and managing around A$5b of diverse loan types. In 2007 it had also licensed and adapted a contemporary core servicing system to form the foundation of its servicing business. Bluestone Capital Management was formed in 2008, focusing on the acquisition and management of consumer loan portfolios, particularly under-performing loans. Bluestone's servicing capabilities were rolled into Bluestone Asset Management, and these two divisions operated in tandem between 2009 and 2014, during the capital markets 'winter'.

The first portfolio was acquired in August 2008, a NZ$150m auto-loan portfolio in New Zealand. This book was acquired from PricewaterhouseCoopers, acting as the administrator of Provincial Finance, a failed NZ finance company. Bluestone co-invested with a US alternative investment fund, Värde Partners to acquire the book, and in September 2008 established a servicing centre in Christchurch, NZ to manage the assets.

In February 2009, an office was established in Cambridge England, from which the group's European expansion strategy was conducted. In October, 2009 the Office of Fair Trading granted Bluestone's UK asset management subsidiary a Consumer Credit License. This approval allowed a subsidiary of Bluestone Capital Management (Bluestone Portfolio Management) to lend to individuals and small business and undertake servicing mandates in relation to a range of consumer loans (including second charge mortgages or mortgages secured on the property outside the United Kingdom).

In 2010, Australia's Macquarie Bank invested A$10m in Bluestone Group, acquiring a 17.5% stake and appointing a Director to Bluestone's Board. At the same time, Forum Partners, a real estate investment fund refinanced approximately $20m of balance sheet debt with a new, 4 year facility, and Bluestone refinanced a further $28m with Bank of Scotland with a similar term.

In September, 2011 Bluestone acquired Close Credit Management from Close Brothers, and re-branded the business Bluestone Credit Management ('BCM'). BCM provides portfolio management services to a range of UK clients including major car and consumer finance businesses and Her Majesty's Revenue & Customs. BCM's 140 staff operate from offices in downtown Sheffield. In December, Bluestone participated in the purchase of a €350m portfolio of car and equipment receivables from Bank of Scotland in Ireland. Bluestone partnered with Värde Partners, a global investment fund to acquire the book. An office was set up in Dublin in March, 2012, and day-to-day management of the portfolio transitioned to Bluestone in early June. This transition involved adapting Bluestone's core technical platform (Boss) for use in Ireland, and migrating the portfolio information from Bank of Scotland's various systems to Boss. A team of 40 were deployed to manage the book, split between the Sheffield and Dublin offices. Shortly afterwards, Bluestone opened a new office in the Zeullig building in downtown Manila to act as a shared services centre for other group offices. Bluestone's Manila operation has over 50 staff now providing support services for Bluestone's Australian offices.

Resumption of Lending
In 2014, Lloyds Development Capital (LDC) acquired approximately 50% of the shares in Bluestone from a number of existing shareholders, joining Macquarie Bank as Bluestone's major institutional shareholders. At the same time, the holding structure of the Group was inverted with the creation of a new UK top-co, Bluestone Consolidated Holdings Limited, which in June 2015 had net assets of £35m. Residential lending resumed in Australia in 2013, funded by a warehouse line from Macquarie Bank, and Bluestone started lending into the auto and equipment space in Ireland in 2014. Bluestone securitised residential mortgages in 2013 in both Australia and New Zealand, taking advantage of the normalisation of the capital markets globally.

Launch of UK and Irish Lending
In 2015, Bluestone acquired Basinghall Finance, an FCA-regulated specialist mortgage originator and servicer originally established by WestLB and more recently managed by EAA, the German government's bad bank. Shortly after, the business was re-branded Bluestone Mortgages with a focus on Bluestone's traditional specialist lending segments.

Bluestone also launched asset finance lending in Ireland in early 2015, funded by a warehouse line with Macquarie, targeting the consumer and SME customers financing cars, light vehicles, and equipment. The business’ distribution network includes more than 550 motor dealers and commercial brokers as of February, 2018. Bluestone's Irish lending business completed its first privately placed ABS securitisation in May 2016, and has been a regular issuer since.

Sale of Australasian Operations
On 26 February 2018, Bluestone announced the sale of its Australasian operations, including its Manila based call-centre, to funds managed by Cerberus Capital Management. A portion of the sale proceeds were then used by Bluestone's parent company, Bluestone Consolidated Holdings, to fund the buy-back and cancellation of all shares held by LDC. The transaction resulted in the management team led by Mr Jeffery acquiring a controlling stake in the company, with major institutional shareholder, Macquarie Bank, doubling its shareholding to 30%. On completion in March, 2018, Bluestone Group had a team in Europe of 170 staff and net assets of over £20m / A$35m. Around the same time, Bluestone moved its head office to the heart of Cambridge's construction and technology boom at One Station Square, Cambridge.

Covid-19 Emergency 
The Covid-19 pandemic emerged in Wuhan, China in late 2019 and despite an aggressive regional 'lockdown', spread globally throughout Q1, 2020.  The UK and Irish government's imposed stringent community lockdowns during March, to try to slow the rate of infection so that the health systems would not be overwhelmed. This had the effect of confining all but essential workers to their home, causing the closure of most motor dealers, mortgage brokers and valuers, and the effective cessation of new business. Bluestone shifted to a work from home model in late March, and closed for new business from early April. In mid-May the mortgage business resumed new lending, joined by the Irish motor finance business in June.

Launch of Fignum 
In late 2020, Bluestone launched its technology business, Fignum (a shortform version of Figures and Numbers). 

 Bluestone Operational History

References

Companies based in Cambridge
Financial services companies established in 2000
Financial services companies of the Republic of Ireland
Financial services companies of the United Kingdom
Multinational companies
2000 establishments in Australia